Brink of Disaster or variation, may refer to:

Television
"Brink of Disaster" (Thunderbirds episode), a 1966 episode of the marionette TV show Thunderbirds
"The Brink of Disaster", a 1964 episode in the Doctor Who serial The Edge of Destruction

Film
 "The Brink of Disaster" (film episode), a chapter of the 1936 film serial Shadow of Chinatown
 "The Brink of Disaster" (film episode), a chapter of the 1936 film serial The Phantom Rider (Universal serial)
 "The Brink of Disaster" (film episode), a chapter of the 1939 film serial The Oregon Trail (1939 serial)
Brink of Disaster! (short film), a 1972 short film by John Florea

Other uses
 Brink of Disaster, Meadow River, West Virginia, USA; a class 5 rapid
 "Brink of Disaster" (song), a 1967 single by Lesley Gore off the album Magic Colors; see Lesley Gore discography

See also

 On the Brink of Destruction (album), a 2010 album by 'Tonic Breed'
 Brinksmanship or brinkmanship
 
 On the Brink (disambiguation)
 Disaster (disambiguation)
 Brink (disambiguation)